Sean Devine (born June 11, 1970) is a Canadian politician, playwright, and actor. Devine currently represents Knoxdale-Merivale Ward on Ottawa City Council. His artistic career has spanned over three decades, including playwriting and directing, as well as acting roles on film and television. He has appeared in over twenty films and more than a dozen TV series.

Early life and education
Devine was born on June 11, 1970 in Montreal, Quebec. From 1987 to 1989 he attended Marianopolis College in Westmount. Afterwards, Devine studied from 1989 to 1992 at the National Theatre School of Canada.

Drama career
Devine served as the artistic director of Horseshoes and Handgrenades Theatre Company between 2004 and 2019.

Devine's 2011 play Re:Union was based on the real-life story of Norman Morrison, a Baltimore Quaker who self-immolated below Secretary of Defense Robert McNamara's Pentagon office in 1965. The play imagines a meeting between Morrison's daughter Emily and Robert McNamara. First produced in 2011, it was published by Scirocco Drama in 2013. At  Ottawa’s Magnetic North Theatre Festival in 2015, Re:Union won the Prix Rideau Award for Ottawa’s Best Production.

Devine's next play, Except in the Unlikely Event of War, premiered in 2013, was a political drama and satire which discusses war and government manipulation of the media. It draws inspiration from The Report from Iron Mountain, a satricial book which asserted that the United States government believed war was necessary to maintain its power.

Devine's 2016 play Daisy is a political drama set during the 1964 United States presidential election. The play depicts the events surrounding the presidential election and the controversial 'Daisy' advertisement of Lyndon B. Johnson's campaign. Daisy premiered at Seattle's ACT Theatre in 2016. The play received the Broadway World Seattle Critic’s Choice Award for Best New Play and was nominated for a Gregory Award for Best New Play. It was later published as a book by Talonbooks in 2017.

Devine's play, titled When There's Nothing Left to Burn was released in 2017. The play was by the events of the 2014 Revolution of Dignity in Ukraine, and drew further inspiration from the 2012 Quebec student protests. It depicts ordinary citizens living in the midst of violent political upheaval. The play won the University of Lethbridge's Fiction at Fifty competition.

In 2017, Devine took a position with the Canada Council for the Arts, a federal government institution dedicated to funding the arts.

Politics
In 2015, Devine won the nomination for the New Democratic Party over PIPSC negotiator Denise Doherty-Delorme to represent the party in the 2015 Canadian federal election in Nepean. Ultimately he placed third, losing to Chandra Arya of the Liberal Party. Devine's was again the NDP's candidate in Nepean in the 2021 Canadian federal election and focused on establishing relationships with communities who felt ignored by Arya such as the Tamil, Punjabi and Sikh members. On this occasion he again placed third, although he received twice the number of votes he had in 2015.

Devine was successfully elected as city councillor for Knoxdale-Merivale Ward in the 2022 Ottawa municipal election, defeating real-estate agent James Dean, Myles Egli (brother of retiring incumbent Keith Egli), and conservative writer Joseph Ben-Ami. Devine's campaign emphasized the need for civility at city hall, improved public transit, and better natural disaster preparedness.

Personal life
Devine resides in the Trend-Arlington neighbourhood of Ottawa with his wife and four children. He previously served as the president of the Trend-Arlington Community Association. During his presidency, Trend-Arlington was severely affected by a tornado in 2018. Under Devine's leadership, the Community Association organized recovery efforts and received awards from the mayor's office and United Way for their work.

Selected filmography

Televeision series

Film

Television films

Electoral record

|-
!rowspan="2" colspan="2"|Candidate
!colspan="3"|Popular vote
!rowspan="2" colspan="2"|Expenditures
|-
! Votes
! %
! ±%
|-
| style="background-color:#E01F5B;" |
| style="text-align:left;"  | Sean Devine 
| style="text-align:right;" | 4,812
| style="text-align:right;" | 39.20
| style="text-align:right;" | –
| style="text-align:right;" |
|-
| style="background-color:#5EA454;" |
| style="text-align:left;"  | James Dean
| style="text-align:right;" | 2,564
| style="text-align:right;" | 20.89
| style="text-align:right;" | +1.05
| style="text-align:right;" |
|-
| style="background-color:#FFF101;" |
| style="text-align:left;"  | Myles Egli
| style="text-align:right;" | 2,051
| style="text-align:right;" | 16.71
| style="text-align:right;" | –
| style="text-align:right;" |
|-
| style="background-color:#202693;" |
| style="text-align:left;"  | Joseph Ben-Ami
| style="text-align:right;" | 1,426
| style="text-align:right;" | 11.62
| style="text-align:right;" | –
| style="text-align:right;" |
|-
| style="background-color:#442565;" |
| style="text-align:left;"  | Michael Wood
| style="text-align:right;" | 1,228
| style="text-align:right;" | 10.00
| style="text-align:right;" | –
| style="text-align:right;" |
|-
| style="background-color:#abdfb9;" |
| style="text-align:left;"  | Peter Westaway
| style="text-align:right;" | 118
| style="text-align:right;" | 0.96
| style="text-align:right;" | –
| style="text-align:right;" |
|-
| style="background-color:#FFFFFF;" |
| style="text-align:left;"  | Peter Anthony Weber
| style="text-align:right;" | 77
| style="text-align:right;" | 0.63
| style="text-align:right;" | -1.99
| style="text-align:right;" |
|-
| style="text-align:right;background-color:#FFFFFF;" colspan="2" |Total valid votes
| style="text-align:right;background-color:#FFFFFF;" | 12,276
| style="text-align:right;background-color:#FFFFFF;" | 97.47
| style="text-align:right;background-color:#c2c2c2;" colspan="2" |
|-
| style="text-align:right;background-color:#FFFFFF;" colspan="2" |Total rejected, unmarked and declined votes
| style="text-align:right;background-color:#FFFFFF;" | 318
| style="text-align:right;background-color:#FFFFFF;" | 2.53
| style="text-align:right;background-color:#c2c2c2;" colspan="2" |
|-
| style="text-align:right;background-color:#FFFFFF;" colspan="2" |Turnout
| style="text-align:right;background-color:#FFFFFF;" | 12,594
| style="text-align:right;background-color:#FFFFFF;" | 45.55
| style="text-align:right;background-color:#FFFFFF;" |
| style="text-align:right;background-color:#c2c2c2;" |
|- 
| style="text-align:right;background-color:#FFFFFF;" colspan="2" |Eligible voters
| style="text-align:right;background-color:#FFFFFF;" | 27,650
| style="text-align:right;background-color:#c2c2c2;" colspan="3" |
|- 
| style="text-align:left;" colspan="6" |Note: Candidate campaign colours are based on the prominent colour used in campaign items (signs, literature, etc.)and are used as a visual differentiation between candidates.
|- 
| style="text-align:left;" colspan="13" |Sources:
|}

References

1970 births
Living people
21st-century Canadian male actors
21st-century Canadian politicians
Anglophone Quebec people
National Theatre School of Canada alumni
21st-century Canadian dramatists and playwrights
Canadian male television actors
Canadian male film actors
Male actors from Montreal
Male actors from Ottawa
Politicians from Montreal
Politicians from Ottawa
Writers from Montreal
Writers from Ottawa
Canadian theatre directors
Canadian actor-politicians
New Democratic Party candidates for the Canadian House of Commons
Ontario candidates for Member of Parliament
Ottawa city councillors